Dijk en Waard (West Frisian Dutch: Doik en Weard/Weerd or Dìk en Weard/Weerd) is a municipality in the province of North Holland and the region of West-Frisia, the Netherlands, formed from the merger of Heerhugowaard and Langedijk. The municipality came into existence on 1 January 2022.

Geography 
As of 2022, the areas encompassed by the municipality have a population of approximately 87 thousand people. The municipality is bordered by Bergen to the west, Alkmaar to the south, Koggenland to the east, Opmeer to the northeast and Hollands Kroon and Schagen to the north. It consists of 16 main population centres, the largest of which is Heerhugowaard.

Politics 
The first elections for the municipality were held on 24 November 2021. The election was won by Dijk&Waardse Independent Party (Dijk&Waardse Onafhankelijke Partij) who received 4431 votes (7 seats), followed by Lokaal Dijk en Waard with 3706 votes (6 seats), VVD with 3071 votes (5 seats), Senioren Dijk en Waard with 2625 votes (4 seats), D66 with 1884 votes (3 seats), GroenLinks with 1879 votes (3 seats), FvD with 1787 votes (3 seats), CDA with 1737 votes (2 seats), PvdA with 1705 votes (2 seats), ChristenUnie with 1170 votes (2 seats), while the Authentiek Dijk en Waard and Blanco (Planken, R.W.J.) failed to get a seat.

Peter Rehwinkel has been acting mayor since January 1, 2022.

References 

 
Municipalities of North Holland
Municipalities of the Netherlands established in 2022